Vithabai Bhau Mang Narayangaonkar (July 1935 – 15 January 2002) was an Indian dancer, singer and Tamasha artist.

Early life and career
Vithabai was born and grew up in a family of artists. She was born in the city of Pandharpur, Solapur district, Maharashtra. Bhau-Bapu Mang Narayangaonkar was the family troupe run by her father and uncle. Her grandfather Narayan Khude set up the troupe. He was from Kavathe Yamai, in Shirur taluka of Pune district. Since childhood, she was exposed to the various forms of songs like Lavanya, Gavlan, Bhedik, etc. As a student she did not fare very well in school, although she performed with effortless beauty on stage, right from a very young age without any formal training.

One of the notable events of her life was the period when her child was born. She was 9 months pregnant while she had been performing for her audience. It was during the performance, that she got to know that she was about to deliver. Being a sound, patient & a brave woman, she went backstage and delivered the baby, cut the umbilical cord with a stone and got ready to join the performance. The audience was surprised to see her with the absence of the baby bump. Upon enquiring and learning about her courageous act and dedication, the show was stopped. The audience praised her for her determination to complete the show, but respectfully asked her to rest. She is always recognised as Legend Tamasha artiste of great repute hailing from the village of Narayangaon in Maharashtra.

She received medals from the President of India in 1957 and 1990 for her art. It is written that despite her fame and the honours she earned she is said to have been in financial distress and was uncared for. Her hospital bills after her death were met by contribution from donors.

Awards and recognition
She achieved high appreciation and thereby her troupe was honoured with the most prestigious President's award in the Tamasha genre of art. She was called "Tamasha Samradini" (Tamasha Empress) by her fans and also honoured so by the government.

Government of Maharashtra has instituted annual "Vithabai Narayangavkar Lifetime Achievement Award" in her memory in 2006. The award is conferred on those who had extensively contributed to the preservation and propagation of the Tamasha Art. The award is being conferred since 2006 and noted recipients of the awards are Smt. Kantabai Satarkar, Vasant Avsarikar, Smt Sulochana Nalawade, Haribhau Badhe, Smt Mangala Bansode (daughter of Vithabai), Sadhu Patsute, Ankush Khade, Prabha Shivanekar, Bhima Sangavikar, Gangaram Kavathekar, Smt Radhabai Khode Nashikkar, Madhukar Nerale. Lokshahir Bashir Momin Kavathekar has been conferred with this award for year  2017-18, for his lifelong contribution to the folk art, Lavani and to the field of Tamasha.

Ms Gulab Sangamnerkar has been conferred with this award for year 2018-19 for her contribution to the Lavani and to the field of Tamasha.
Mr. Aatambar Shirdhonkar (for year 2019-20) and Ms Sandhya Mane (for year 2020-21) has been selected for this award due to their contribution to the field of Tamasha.

References

Indian women folk singers
Indian folk singers
Marathi people
1935 births
Folk artists
20th-century Indian singers
2002 deaths
People from Solapur district
20th-century Indian actresses
Indian musical theatre actresses
20th-century Indian women singers
Singers from Maharashtra
Actresses from Maharashtra
Women musicians from Maharashtra